Leuna-Kötzschau was a Verwaltungsgemeinschaft ("collective municipality") in the Saalekreis district, in Saxony-Anhalt, Germany. The seat of the Verwaltungsgemeinschaft was in Leuna. It was disbanded in January 2010.

The Verwaltungsgemeinschaft Leuna-Kötzschau consisted of the following municipalities:
 Friedensdorf
 Leuna
 Wallendorf

Former Verwaltungsgemeinschaften in Saxony-Anhalt